Jorge Luis Vásquez (born July 16, 1978 in Nagua, Dominican Republic) is a former Major League Baseball pitcher.

Career
That year, he pitched in two games, had no decisions, and an ERA of 8.10. He struck out four and walked one. That winter, on December 18, he was traded to the Atlanta Braves in exchange for Eli Marrero and cash. That year, he appeared in 5 games, picking up one win, no losses, and having an ERA of 3.00. That winter, the Braves released him and he has not appeared in the majors since. In , he pitched in the Texas Rangers organization.

Vásquez has pitched the past three seasons in the Mexican League. He spent 2012 and 2013 with the Newark Bears of the independent Can-Am League.

External links

1978 births
Living people
Altoona Curve players
Atlanta Braves players
Bakersfield Blaze players
Baseball players at the 2007 Pan American Games
Calgary Vipers players
Dominican Republic expatriate baseball players in Canada
Dominican Republic expatriate baseball players in the United States
Edmonton Capitals players
Frisco RoughRiders players
Kansas City Royals players

Major League Baseball pitchers
Major League Baseball players from the Dominican Republic
Mississippi Braves players
Newark Bears players
Oklahoma RedHawks players
People from Nagua
Richmond Braves players
Wichita Wranglers players
Wilmington Blue Rocks players
Pan American Games competitors for the Dominican Republic